Star is a 1982 Indian Bollywood movie, directed by Vinod Pande, starring Kumar Gaurav, Rati Agnihotri, Raj Kiran, Saeed Jaffrey, A.K. Hangal, Dina Pathak and Padmini Kolhapure.

It had a very successful soundtrack released as Star/Boom Boom, produced by Biddu and sung by Nazia Hassan and Zoheb Hassan. Despite popular soundtracks, the movie flopped at the box office.

Nazia and Zoheb were offered the chance to act in this movie by Biddu, but they refused to act and chose singing.

Plot
Dev Kumar Verma comes from a middle-class family and must find employment to support his parents. Dev, however, has set his mind upon becoming a music sensation like Elvis Presley.

He loses his job because of this and refuses to work until he gets a job to his liking, much to his parents' dismay and his brother, Shiv Kumar Verma. Dev gets employment at Charlie's Disco, where he meets Maya and falls in love with her.

When Charlie's Disco's competitor, Rana, finds out about Dev, he wants to hire Dev, but Dev decides to continue to work with Charlie's Disco. Consequently, Dev and Charlie get beaten up by Rana's men, and Dev cannot sing.

After recuperating, Dev is devastated to find out that Maya and Shiv are in love with each other.

Cast

 Kumar Gaurav...Dev Kumar Verma 
 Rati Agnihotri...Maya 
 Padmini Kolhapure...Dev's fan 
 Raj Kiran...Shiv Kumar Verma 
 Saeed Jaffrey...Rana
 A.K. Hangal...Mr. Verma
 Dina Pathak...Mrs. Verma
 Raja Bundela...Salim (Dev's friend)
 Ravindra Kapoor...Charlie
 Rajendra Kumar...Himself (Guest Appearance)
 Bob Christo...Samson
 Yunus Parvez...Dev's employer
 Biddu...Himself (Guest Appearance)
 Dinesh Kaushik as Contestant singer
 Piloo Wadia....Parsee lady waiting for lift
 Vinod Pande...(guest appearance) as police inspector in hospital
 Devika Bhojwani...Contest announcer

Soundtrack

All songs were sung by Pakistani pop duo Nazia and Zoheb, consisting of Nazia Hassan and her brother Zoheb Hassan.

Awards and nominations
Filmfare Nomination for Best Female Playback Singer - Nazia Hassan for the song "Boom Boom"

References

External links
 
 Cult of Kumar

1980s Hindi-language films
Indian musical films
Indian dance films
1982 musical films
1982 films
Films scored by Biddu